Open container may refer to:

 United States open-container laws, laws regarding the use of open alcohol containers in the United States of America
 Open Container Initiative, a Free and Open Source project and specification for Linux containers
 Open container an album by The Expendables